Emmiganur  is a village in the southern state of Karnataka, India. It is located in the Kampli taluk of Bellary district in Karnataka.

Demographics
As of the 2001 Indian census, Emmiganur had a population of 12,720, with 6415 males and 6305 females.

See also
 Bellary
 Districts of Karnataka

References

External links
 http://Bellary.nic.in/

Villages in Bellary district